Sporendocladia is a genus of anamorphic fungi in the family Ceratocystidaceae. The widespread genus contains seven species.

References

External links

Sordariomycetes